Thomas Gibbs may refer to:
Thomas Mannington Gibbs (died 1720), translator of Gomberville
Thomas Gibbs (mayor) (1798–1859), mayor of Atlanta
Thomas Nicholson Gibbs (1821–1883), Canadian politician
Thomas Van Renssalaer Gibbs (1855–1898), American politician
Thomas Gibbs (British politician) for Stafford (UK Parliament constituency)
Tom Gibbs, U.S. Army veteran and candidate in the United States House of Representatives elections in Louisiana, 2010

See also

Gibbs (surname)

Thomas Gibb (disambiguation)
Thomas (disambiguation)
Gibbs (disambiguation)